Samuel William Fores, often credited as S. W. Fores (1761 – 3 February 1838) was an English illustrator and publisher/printer based in Piccadilly, London. Fores, the son of a cloth merchant, began his career publishing his illustrations in 1783. He operated from premises at No 3 Piccadilly from 1785 and moved to 50 Piccadilly from 1795. He specialised in caricature, typically hand-coloured, singly issued prints. He became successful at marketing his works, which he often sold wholesale. Fores acquired a particularly large collection of caricatures, and at one time was said to have "the completest collection in the kingdom" in his Caricature Museum. He died in February 1838 at the age of 77 and was buried in his family vault at St. James Church in Jermyn Street.

Works
The National Portrait Gallery documents 64 of his works or works he published. As a publisher he published cartoons designed by Gillray and Rowlandson, such as Rowlandson's Comforts of Bath series. One of his depictions was of the March 1791 fire at Albion Mills adjacent to Blackfriars Bridge. In 1793 he was noted for his caricatures of the French Revolution, especially his Complete Model of the Guilllotine, which was reported by some to be as high as six feet. Visitors were charged a shilling to view it.

References

English caricaturists
English illustrators
Publishers (people) from London
1761 births
1838 deaths
Artists from London